When Willie Comes Marching Home is a 1950 World War II comedy film directed by John Ford and starring Dan Dailey and Corinne Calvet.  It is based on the 1945 short story "When Leo Comes Marching Home" by Sy Gomberg. The film won the Golden Leopard at the Locarno International Film Festival.

Sy Gomberg also received an Oscar nomination for Best Motion Picture Story at the 23rd Academy Awards in 1951 but was edged out for the award by Edna Anhalt and Edward Anhalt for Panic in the Streets.

The film was referred to in M*A*S*H (1970), directed by Robert Altman.

Plot
William "Bill" Kluggs is the first in his hometown of Punxatawney, West Virginia, to enlist in the Army Air Forces after the attack on Pearl Harbor, making his father Herman, mother Gertrude and girlfriend Marge Fettles proud. The whole town sees him off. Willie tries to become a pilot but washes out, although he proves to be so proficient at aerial gunnery that, rather than being sent to Europe to fight, he is made an instructor and assigned to a base near his hometown. After two years in the same place, he is branded a coward by the townsfolk, even though he continually requests a transfer into combat.

He finally gets his chance when a gunner on a B-17 Flying Fortress bomber gets sick and Bill is allowed to take his place. The plane takes off for England, but owing to fog, is unable to land and runs low on fuel. The crew is ordered to bail out, but Bill is asleep and does not parachute out of the plane until it is over German-occupied France.

He is captured immediately by the local French Resistance unit, led by Yvonne. While there, he sees a secret German rocket launch, which is filmed by the Resistance. He and the film are picked up by a British torpedo boat and taken to England. There, he passes the vital information and his eyewitness confirmation on to a series of important generals, first in London and then in Washington, D.C.

All this time, he is not allowed to sleep and plied with liquor as a pick-me-up or to settle motion sickness. Bill finally collapses, exhausted. He is sent to a military hospital to recuperate, under strict orders not to reveal anything. A doctor mistakenly puts him into the psychopathic ward. Willie escapes and heads home on a freight train.

Despite his strict orders, he tells his father and girlfriend what he has accomplished. Only four days have elapsed since he left Punxatawney, and they do not believe his story. Then officers arrive to return him to Washington to be decorated personally by the President of the United States.

Cast
 Dan Dailey as William "Bill" Kluggs
 Corinne Calvet as Yvonne
 Colleen Townsend as Marge Fettles
 William Demarest as Herman Kluggs
 Jimmy Lydon as Charles "Charlie" Fettles
 Lloyd Corrigan as Major Adams
 Evelyn Varden as Mrs. Gertrude Kluggs

Mae Marsh, formerly a successful silent-era actress, appears in an unbilled role.  Alan Hale Jr. and Vera Miles also appear in unbilled roles, early in their respective careers.

Production
Hollywood precision pilot Paul Mantz performed the crash stunt in which a PT-13D Stearman military training aircraft shears off its wings crashing between two oak trees.

References

External links

 

1950 films
1950s war comedy films
20th Century Fox films
American war comedy films
American black-and-white films
Films scored by Alfred Newman
Films directed by John Ford
Golden Leopard winners
American World War II films
Films based on short fiction
Military humor in film
1950 comedy films
1950s English-language films
1950s American films